Muffin Top: A Love Story is a 2014 American romantic comedy directed by Cathryn Michon, who also starred in the film. The film's script was written by Michon with her husband W. Bruce Cameron. It is based on her 2004 novel The Grrl Genius Guide to Sex (With Other People), which was partially based on her life. Muffin Top was Michon's second directorial effort, after 2007's Cook Off!, though that film would not be released until 2017. The film stars Michon as a woman who must re-enter the dating world after her husband (played by Diedrich Bader) leaves her for a younger woman. It had its world debut on October 18, 2014 at the Carmel International Film Festival. Distribution for the film was handled by the on-demand movie distribution website Tugg, which allowed Michon to show her film in areas with high enough demand. Muffin Top was also released via VOD.

Plot
Suzanne (Cathryn Michon) is a professor of Women's Studies Pop Culture at Malibu University. On her birthday her husband Michael (Diedrich Bader) surprises her by saying that he's divorcing her in favor of his co-worker Jessica (Haylie Duff), prompting her to go on a quest to find herself.

Cast
Cathryn Michon as Suzanne Nicholson
Marissa Jaret Winokur as Elise
Diedrich Bader as Michael Nicholson
Jill Holden as Dr. Nadja Borman
Haylie Duff as Jessica
Jane Morris as Dr. Khalsa
Wayne Federman as Hayes Greenberg
Michael Hawley as Jarod
Dot-Marie Jones as Christina
Cristine Rose as Deborah
Melissa Peterman as Kim
Michael Halpi as Barnaby
Gary Anthony Williams as Gregory David Gregory
Victoria Bohush as Andrea
Dominique Dorian as Sophie
David Arquette as Cameron Scott
Meredith Scott Lynn as Katey
Tucker as BooBoo

Production
Filming for Muffin Top took place in Hollywood, California over a four-week period with a budget of under $1 million. While choosing the film's music Michon decided to only use music composed by female performers and she has billed Muffin Top as the "first rom-com to have an all-female soundtrack and score" and as a "body image romantic comedy".

Reception
Critical reception has been mixed. The Oakland Press wrote a favorable review for Muffin Top, stating that "most readers have probably never heard of this movie, which I think is a shame." The Windy City Times commented upon the film's central focus on women, which they felt was "one of the reasons The Babadook and why actor-writer-director Cathryn Michon's comedy Muffin Top: A Love Story are such refreshing finds."

The Star Tribune wrote a mixed review, criticizing it for utilizing vignettes while also encouraging viewers to support the flawed lead heroine while laughing at her unbearable dates. However they also stated that while the film did not match up to female oriented films like Bridesmaids, it was also "tolerably funny" and deserved a B for effort. A reviewer for Chicagoist panned Muffin Top and included it in their "worst of the year" list, writing "Made with obvious good intentions, the indie comedy Muffin Top: A Love Story has little else going for it. Its basic plea for women to not allow their self-esteem to be damaged by unrealistic, media-enforced notions of an ideal body is a welcome message. Unfortunately, it is delivered via a frequently irritating and laugh-free feature made almost bearable by some talented cast members."

References

External links
 
 
 

2014 films
2014 romantic comedy films
Films shot in California
Films based on American novels
American romantic comedy films
2014 directorial debut films
2010s English-language films
2010s American films